Evgeny Bronislavovich Pashukanis (Russian: Евгений Брониславович Пашуканис; 23 February 1891 – 4 September 1937) was a Soviet legal scholar, best known for his work The General Theory of Law and Marxism.

Early life and October Revolution
Pashukanis was born in Staritsa, in the Tver Governorate in the Russian Empire.  The Pashukanis family was of Lithuanian background; he was a cousin of the publisher, Vikentiy Pashukanis.  Influenced by his family, particularly his uncle, he joined the Russian Social Democratic Workers' Party (RSLDP) in Saint Petersburg at the age of 17. In 1909, he started studying jurisprudence in Saint Petersburg. As a result of his socialist activism, the Czarist police threatened Pashukanis with banishment, so he left Russia for Germany in 1910. He continued his studies in Munich. During World War I, he returned to his native Russia. In 1914, he helped draft the RSLDP resolution opposing the war. Following the 1917 October Revolution and the establishment of the Soviet Russia, Pashukanis joined the Russian Communist Party (b), after its founding in 1918. In August 1918, he became a judge in Moscow. Meanwhile, he launched his career as a legal scholar. He also held a post in the Ministry of Foreign Affairs and was an adviser to the Soviet embassy in Berlin, helping to draft the Rapallo Treaty of 1922. In 1924 he was transferred to full-time academic duties as a member of the Communist Academy.

By 1930, Pashukanis was the Vice President of the Communist Academy.

The General Theory of Law and Marxism
In 1924, Pashukanis published his seminal work, The General Theory of Law and Marxism. This is best known for Pashukanis' formulation of the "Commodity Exchange Theory of Law". This theory was built on two pillars of Marxist thought: (1) in the organization of society the economic factor is paramount; legal and moral principles and institutions therefore constitute a kind of superstructure reflecting the economic organization of society; and (2) in the finally achieved state of communism, law and the state will wither away. If communism is achieved, morality as it is typically understood will cease to perform any function.

«Why does class rule not remain what it is, the factual subjugation of one section of the population by the other? Why does it assume the form of official state rule, or - which is the same thing – why does the machinery of state coercion not come into being as the private machinery of the ruling class; why does it detach itself from the ruling class and take on the form of an impersonal apparatus of public power, separate from society? […] Another of the things with which Comrade Stuchka reproaches me - namely that I recognise the existence of law only in bourgeois society, I grant…» (E. B. Pashukanis, The General Theory of Law and Marxism, 1924).

Latter years
From 1925 to 1927, Pyotr Stuchka, another Soviet legal scholar, and Pashukanis compiled an Encyclopedia of State and Law and started a journal named Revolution of Law. In 1927, he was elected a full member of the Communist Academy, eventually becoming its vice-president. He and Stuchka started a section on General Theory of State and Law at the Academy. However, in 1930, Nikolai Bukharin was attacked by Stalin, because he insisted that the state must wither away to bring forth communism, as Marx had advocated. He was then stripped of all his political posts. Pashukanis soon came under pressure from the government as well. As a result, Pashukanis started to revise his theory of state. He stopped working with his friend Stuchka. It is unclear whether Pashukanis's transformation was simply the result of fear for his safety, or whether he actually changed his mind. He was rewarded by being made director of the Institute of Soviet Construction and Law (predecessor of the Institute of State and Law of the Soviet Academy of Sciences) in 1931. In 1936, he was appointed as Deputy Commissar of Justice of the USSR and was proposed for membership in the Soviet Academy of Sciences.

According to Andreas Harms, Pashukanis was denounced as an "enemy of the people" by Pyotr Yudin. On 20 January 1937, Pashukanis was arrested and Andrey Vyshinsky soon replaced him at the Institute of Soviet Construction and Law. Alfred Krishianovich Stalgevich, a longtime critic of Pashukanis, took over his courses at the Moscow Juridical Institute.

After publishing many self-criticisms, Pashukanis was eventually denounced as a "trotskyite saboteur" in 1937 and executed in September 1937 on charges of being involved in an "underground anti-Soviet terrorist organisation".  

Pashukanis was posthumously rehabilitated in 1957, although his theories were not adopted by mainstream Soviet jurisprudence at that time.

He gained relevance in the German State derivation debate in the 1970s.

See also
Evgeny A. Korovin, Pashukanis' contemporary at the Institute of State and Law
List of Russian legal historians
Communist Academy

Notes

Bibliography 
 Carlo Di Mascio, Pašukanis e la critica marxista del diritto borghese, Firenze, Phasar Edizioni, 2013. 
 Carlo Di Mascio, Note su 'Hegel. Stato e diritto' di Evgeny Pashukanis, Firenze, Phasar Edizioni, 2020.

External links
Evgeny Pashukanis (including a list of works) at the Marxists' Internet Archive

1891 births
1937 deaths
People from Staritsky District
People from Staritsky Uyezd
Old Bolsheviks
Communist Party of the Soviet Union members
Great Purge victims from Russia
Legal writers
Soviet jurists
Russian Social Democratic Labour Party members
Soviet non-fiction writers
Soviet male writers
Soviet rehabilitations
20th-century non-fiction writers
Male non-fiction writers